Gerhard Breitenberger (born 14 October 1954, in Austria) is a former international Austrian footballer.

His son, Gerhard Breitenberger Junior, plays for SK Austria Kärnten

References

External links
 
 

1954 births
Living people
Austrian footballers
Austria international footballers
1978 FIFA World Cup players
LASK players
Austrian Football Bundesliga players
Expatriate footballers in Belgium
K.R.C. Mechelen players
Association football defenders
Austrian expatriate footballers
Austrian expatriate sportspeople in Belgium
People from Hallein
Footballers from Salzburg (state)